Juncus hybridus is a species of annual herb in the family Juncaceae (rushes). They have a self-supporting growth form and have simple, broad leaves.

Sources

References 

hybridus
Flora of Malta